Kaatelal & Sons is an Indian television series that aired on Sony SAB from 16 November 2020 to 27 August 2021. Produced by Contiloe Entertainment, it starred Jiya Shankar, Megha Chakraborty, Ashok Lokhande, Sachin Chaudhary, Sahil Phull and Vinay Rohrra.

Plot
The plot initially focused on twin sisters Susheela and Garima, who fight against patriarchal traditions to run the family's ancestral salon called Kaatelal & Sons by disguising themselves as Gunnu-Sattu when their father had an accident. They soon realise that their passion was the saloon.

When they face the same norms of patricarchy from their in-laws, they again successfully change the society's and their in-laws' mentality with the help of their husbands Agni Rajawat (Garima's husband), Madhav Solanki (Susheela's husband), and their cousin Putrapaal, called Puttu by family.

Cast

Main
 Megha Chakraborty as Garima "Gunnu" Kaatelal Ruhail Rajawat – Dharampal and Kusum's elder daughter; Susheela's twin sister; Agni's wife. (2020–2021)
 Jiya Shankar as Susheela "Sattu" Kaatelal Ruhail Solanki – Dharampal and Kusum's younger daughter; Garima's twin sister; Pramod's ex-fiancée; Madhav's wife. (2020–2021)
 Ashok Lokhande as Dharampal Kaatelal Ruhail – Shishupal's brother; Kusum's husband; Garima and Susheela's father. (2020–2021)

Recurring
 Paras Arora as Dr.Pramod Chautala – Meenakshi and Jai's son, Priyanka's brother; Susheela's ex-fiancé. (2020–2021)
 Sahil Phull as S.H.O Agni Rajawat – Komal's son; Paavni's brother; Garima's husband. (2021)
 Sachin Chaudhary as Putrapaal "Puttu" Kaatelal Ruhail – Shishupal and Chanchal's son; Garima, Susheela and Ritu's cousin brother; Paavni's love interest. (2020–2021)
 Hemaakshi Ujjain as Kusum Kaatelal Ruhail – Dharmpal's wife; Garima and Susheela's mother. (2020–2021)
 Swati Tarar as Chanchal "Chatur" Kaatelal Ruhail – Ghanshyam's sister; Shishupal's wife; Putrapaal's mother. (2020-2021)
 Manoj Goyal as Shishupal Kaatelal Ruhail – Dharampal's brother; Chanchal's husband; Putrapaal's father. (2020–2021)
 Meena Mir as Komal Devi Rajawat – Agni and Paavni's mother. (2021)
 Prerna Thakur as Paavni Rajawat – Komal's daughter; Agni's sister; Putrapaal's love interest(2021)
 Pankaj Berry as Balraj Solanki – Omi's father; Madhav's adoptive father. (2021) 
 Sydharth Jeet Singh as Omi Solanki – Balraj's son; Madhav's adoptive brother. (2021)
Ankit Mohan as Vikram – Jagat's namesake brother; Garima's former love-interest; Gunnu's best friend; Priyanka's boyfriend (2020–2021).
 Alice Kaushik as Priyanka Chautala – Garima and Susheela's friend; Vikram's girlfriend, Pramod's sister (2020-2021)
 Deepak Tokas as Jagat Seth PhD – Dharampal's rival; Vikram's namesake brother. (2020–2021)
 Manav Soneji as Phitkari – A helper in Kaatelal & Sons. (2020–2021).
 Karuna Verma as CMO Dr. Meenakshi "Mini" Chautala – Jai's wife; Pramod's mother. (2020–2021)
 Hans Dev Sharma as Dr. Jai Chautala – Meenakshi's husband; Pramod's father. (2020–2021)
 Sanjeev Satija as Chunni – Dharampal, Avatar and Lallan's friend. (2020-2021)
Sandeep Sharma as Satyapal – Chuni and Dharmpal's friend. (2021)
 Mukesh Chandel as Lallan – Dharampal, Chunni and Avatar's friend. (2020–2021)
 Naman Arora as Ompal (2020–2021)
 Prashanth Goswami as Satbeer (2020–2021)
 Thakur Rajveer Singh as Bhagwan Das – A thief (2021)
 Jayant Raval as Ghanshyam – Chanchal's brother; Ritu's father (2021)
 Simran Arora as Ritu – Ghanshyam's daughter; Putrapaal's cousin. (2021)
 Sapan Gulati as Shekhar – Ritu's fiancé (2021)
 Vedika Bhandari as Lily – Pramod's fake wife sent by Meenakshi (2021)
 Radhika Chabbra as Billy Cat – Kitkot famous girl with modern thoughts; first female customers of Kaatelal & Sons (2020-2021)

Cameo
 Sukhbir as himself: the guest at Lohri(2021)

Production

Casting
Jiya Shankar and Megha Chakraborty were cast to play Garima and Susheela respectively. Alongside them Ankit Mohan and Paras Arora was cast to play their love interest. While in February Mohan made an exit making Sahil Phull entering the parallel lead. 
In July even Arora left the show making Vinay Rohra enter the show as the new lead.

See also 
 List of programs broadcast by Sony SAB

References

External links 
 
 Kaatelal & Sons on Sony SAB
 Contiloe Entertainment

2020 Indian television series debuts
Hindi-language television shows
Indian comedy television series
Indian television sitcoms
Indian television soap operas
Sony SAB original programming
Television shows set in Haryana
2021 Indian television series endings